The 2013 SARU Community Cup (known as the 2013 Cell C Community Cup for sponsorship reasons) was the first season of the SARU Community Cup competition and was contested from 16 February to 1 April 2013. The tournament is the top competition for non-university rugby union clubs in South Africa.

Competition

Format

Twenty teams qualified for the Community Cup from the club leagues of the fourteen provincial unions in South Africa. The league winners all qualified, as well as six wildcard teams chosen by SARU.

The format of the Community Cup was exactly the same as the Rugby World Cup. The teams were divided into four pools, each containing five teams each. They would then play four pool games, playing other teams in their respective pools once each. Each team played two home games and two away games.

The winner and runner-up of each pool entered the play-off stage, held at a central venue over the Easter long weekend each year. The play-offs consisted of quarter finals, semi-finals and the final. The winner of each pool met the runner-up of a different pool in a quarter final. The winner of each quarter-final progressed to the semi-finals and the semi-final winners to the final, held at a neutral venue.

The losing semi-finalists played each other in the Plate final. The losing quarter finalists met in the Bowl semi-final, the winners of which played in the Bowl final, while the losers played in the Shield final.

Teams

The following teams were named by SARU as participants in the 2013 SARU Community Cup:

Team Listing

Pool stages
On 22 November 2012, the draw was made for the 2013 SARU Community Cup and the 20 teams were drawn in the 4 pools.

Pool A

Log

Fixtures and results

Round one

Round two

Round three

Round four

Round Five

Pool B

Log

Fixtures and results

Round one

Round two

Round three

Round four

Round Five

Pool C

Log

Fixtures and results

Round one

Round two

Round three

Round four

Round Five

Pool D

Log

Fixtures and results

Round one

Round two

Round three

Round four

Round Five

Finals

Quarter-finals
The winning teams qualify to the Cup Semi-Finals, while the losing teams qualify to the Bowl Semi-Finals.

Cup Semi-Finals
The winning teams qualify to the Cup Final, while the losing teams qualify to the Plate Final.

Bowl Semi-Finals
The winning teams qualify to the Bowl Final, while the losing teams qualify to the Shield Final.

Cup Final

Plate Final

Bowl Final

Shield Final

Honours

External links

References

2013
2013 in South African rugby union
2013 rugby union tournaments for clubs